Burns is an unincorporated community located in the town of Burns, La Crosse County, Wisconsin, United States. The community was named after Timothy Burns, a member of the Wisconsin Assembly and the third Lieutenant Governor of Wisconsin, who played a part in promoting the area.

Notes

Unincorporated communities in La Crosse County, Wisconsin
Unincorporated communities in Wisconsin